Israel Mazin (Hebrew: ישראל מזין) is an Israeli technology entrepreneur. He is currently the chairman and CEO of MEMCYCO, a cybersecurity company.

Biography 

Mazin was born in Tel Aviv, Israel. During his military service in his early life, he was a member of Mamram, the Israel Defense Forces' central computing system unit, providing data processing services for all arms and the general staff of the IDF. In 1990, Mazin founded Memco Software, a now-defunct open-operating system security software company. In 1998, Memco was acquired by Platinum Technology in a stock-for-stock pooling of interests, valued at just over $400 million. In 1999, Platinum was acquired by CA for $3.5 billion. After the acquisition, he moved on to establish GAMA Property. Later on, he co-founded Shadow Technologies with Eli Mashiah, the company hosting and managing the-shadow.com. Ever since, Mazin has been investing in High-Tech startups, and in 2021 he co-founded MEMCYCO (Memco-Cyber-Corporation), a Digital-Watermark Authentication technology for B2B and B2C online communication. In 2018 Mazin has received honorary degree from Holon Institute of Technology - HIT.

References 

Israeli business executives
People from Tel Aviv
Living people
Year of birth missing (living people)
Businesspeople in technology